Pooja is a 1954 Bollywood film starring Bharat Bhushan and Purnima, produced and distributed by Varma Films.  It was directed by Bhagwan Das Varma, one of the founders of Varma Films, who also wrote the screenplay for the film. It was the first film in which Purnima, who had previously worked in character roles for various movies for Varma Films, worked as the leading actress playing the role of a child widow.

The film revolves around the issue of remarriage of Indian women in general and, more specifically, remarriage by widows.

Plot
When Keshav Das (Badri Prasad), a temple singer falls ill, his daughter Kala (Purnima) starts singing in his place at the temple.  Although the temple priest (Om Prakash) likes her singing, he forbids Kala from singing any more at the temple when he learns that she is a child widow. To protest the temple priest's decision, Keshav Das decides that he too will not sing anymore at the temple.

With no alternate singer being available in the village, the temple priest and the elders invite Deepak (Bharat Bhushan) to sing for the temple.  Kesav Das likes Deepak's singing and invites him to learn more about music by living with him and Kala.  As the days pass, Deepak falls in love with Kala without knowing that she is a child widow.

A particularly poignant scene in the movie occurs on Holi day.  Deepak, not knowing that Kala is a widow, sprinkles color on her, much to the chagrin of villagers who see the color on Kala's forehead.  Particularly annoyed is Bimmo (Shakuntala), who is supposedly Kala's friend, but has also fallen in love with Deepak.  Given the love emerging between Deepak and Kala, Bimmo takes the matter up with the Panchayat, consisting of the respected and wise elders of the local community.  The Mukhiya (Hiralal), or head of the Panchayat, who also happens to be Bimmo's father, calls a meeting of the Panchayat in which Deepak's and Kala's love is condemned because Kala is a widow and is not allowed to remarry.  Ramlal (Jankidas), a wise neighbor, suggests that Deepak and Kala leave town in the hope that their love will be more accepted elsewhere.  The movie thus ends with a depiction of the consequences of forbidden love.

Cast
Bharat Bhushan as Deepak
Purnima as Kala
Om Prakash as Head Priest of the temple
Badri Prasad as Keshav Das
Shakuntala as Bimmo aka Bimala
Hiralal as Mukhiya
Jankidas as Ramlal

Soundtrack
Music was composed by Shankar–Jaikishan, while Hasrat Jaipuri and Shailendra wrote the songs. In addition to well-known singers like Mohammed Rafi and Lata Mangeshkar, one of the songs in the film featured the  renowned vocalist and classical musician Krishnarao Phulambrikar.

Release
Pooja was released in 1954, the year in which Bhagwan Das married Purnima. It was Purnima's second marriage.

A predominantly moving song in the movie was "Holi Ayi Pyari Bhar Pichakari" where lyricist Shailendra implicitly hopes that Holi can be celebrated by all.  In 2013, almost sixty years after the release of “Pooja” in 1954, Shailendra's vision was realized.  In an attempt to integrate widows socially into the mainstream, nearly 800 widows were encouraged to celebrate Holi at Vrindavan, a sacred city where Lord Krishna is said to have spent much of his childhood.

References

External links

1954 films
1950s Hindi-language films
Remarriage
Indian romantic drama films
1954 romantic drama films
Indian black-and-white films